Kyle Douglas Steyn (born 29 January 1994) is a South African and Scottish professional rugby union player who plays as a centre or wing for United Rugby Championship side Glasgow Warriors and the Scotland national team. Born in Johannesburg, South Africa, he began his career with the Griquas before moving to Scotland in 2019. He qualifies to play for Scotland through his mother, who is from Glasgow.

Professional career

Steyn represented Griquas in the Currie Cup and the Rugby Challenge in South Africa in 2017 and 2018.

He currently plays for United Rugby Championship club Glasgow Warriors.

On 30 August 2022 he was named as the new captain of Glasgow Warriors by head coach Franco Smith.

International career

Steyn was born in South Africa, but qualifies for Scotland representation through his mother, who is from Glasgow. He has represented Scotland in rugby sevens since 2018.

In March 2019, Steyn was called up to Scotland's Six Nations squad prior to the Calcutta Cup match against England after injuries to fellow wings Blair Kinghorn and Tommy Seymour. He was called up again to the 2020 Six Nations Championship squad. He was given a full senior Scotland cap against France in the Six Nations Championship on 8 March 2020. Scotland won the match 28–17. On his first start for Scotland in October 2021, Steyn scored four tries during a 60–14 defeat of Tonga.

References

External links

1994 births
Living people
South African rugby union players
Scotland international rugby sevens players
Rugby union centres
Rugby union wings
Griquas (rugby union) players
Rugby union players from Johannesburg
Scotland international rugby union players
Glasgow Warriors players
Scottish rugby union players
South African people of Scottish descent
Stellenbosch University alumni